Gavan Rex Horsley (born c. 1933) was a rugby union player who represented Australia.

Horsley, a wing, was born in Coorparoo, Queensland and claimed 1 international rugby cap for Australia. He was educated at the Anglican Church Grammar School.

References

Australian rugby union players
Australia international rugby union players
Living people
People educated at Anglican Church Grammar School
Year of birth missing (living people)
Rugby union players from Brisbane
Rugby union wings